Ellsworth may refer to:

People
Ellsworth (surname)
Ellsworth P. Bertholf, US Coast Guard commodore
Ellsworth B. Buck, American politician
Ellsworth Bunker, American diplomat
Ellsworth Burnett, American politician
Ellsworth Cunningham, also known as Bert, American baseball player
Ellsworth Foote, American politician
Ellsworth "Bumpy" Johnson, American criminal
Ellsworth Kelly, American artist
Ellsworth Vines, American tennis player
Elmer Ellsworth Adams, American businessman, newspaper editor, and politician
Elmer E. Ellsworth, first Union casualty in the American Civil War

Places 
In the United States
 Ellsworth, Connecticut, an unincorporated community in the town of Sharon
 Ellsworth, Illinois
 Ellsworth, Indiana, in Dubois County
 Ellsworth, Indiana, now known as North Terre Haute, Indiana 
 Ellsworth, Iowa 
 Ellsworth, Kansas
 Ellsworth, Maine
 Ellsworth, Michigan 
 Ellsworth, Minnesota
 Ellsworth, Missouri
 Ellsworth, Nebraska
 Ellsworth, New Hampshire
 Ellsworth, Ohio
 Ellsworth, Pennsylvania
 Ellsworth (town), Wisconsin
 Ellsworth, Wisconsin, village in the town of Ellsworth
 Ellsworth Air Force Base, South Dakota
 Ellsworth County, Kansas
 Ellsworth Township, Michigan 
 Ellsworth Township, Meeker County, Minnesota

In Antarctica
Named after Lincoln Ellsworth:
 Ellsworth Land, a portion of the Antarctic continent bounded on the west by Marie Byrd Land and on the north by Bellingshausen Sea
 Ellsworth Mountains, the highest range of Antarctica
 Ellsworth Station
 Mount Ellsworth (Antarctica), highest peak of Queen Maud Mountains
 Lake Ellsworth (Antarctica), a subglacial lake

Companies 
 Ellsworth Handcrafted Bicycles Inc., a high end US bicycle manufacturer.

Other 
 Ellsworth (character), a cartoon character of the Walt Disney Company
 Ellsworth Avenue, a major thoroughfare in the Shadyside neighborhood of Pittsburgh, Pennsylvania
 Ellsworth Community College, a US college in Iowa Falls, Iowa
 Ellsworth Toohey, a character in Ayn Rand's novel The Fountainhead
 "Ellsworth", a 2006 song by Rascal Flatts from their album Me and My Gang

See also 
 Justice Ellsworth (disambiguation)
 Lake Ellsworth (disambiguation)